

Champions

Number of championships by school

References

Champions list at the official NCAA Philippines website
Bok Man Kim - Founder of Taekwondo in the Philippines
Presidents and hosts list at the official NCAA Philippines website

See also
Taekwondo in the Philippines
UAAP Taekwondo Championship

Taekwondo in the Philippines
Taekwondo
Taekwondo competitions